Xinfengjiang Reservoir or Wanlü Lake is a man-made lake located in Heyuan, Guangdong, China, formed since the damming of the Xinfeng River (a tributary of Dong River) by the Xinfengjiang Dam. The dam is about 6 km away from the downtown of Heyuan and 170 km away from Guangzhou. It is the largest lake in Guangdong covering an area of 370 km² and it has a storage capacity of 13.98 km³.

Xinfengjiang Reservoir is known for its clear and almost drinkable water, such as that used to produce the renowned Nongfu Spring brand of mineral water (Generally, it is provided South China). Otherwise, the lake, which is famous for the name of "Wanlü Lake" (evergreen in Chinese),is an important tourist attraction of Guangdong.

History
Guangdong is located in the area of Humid subtropical climate and full of water resource. Before 1958, the Xinfengjiang River is an important transport line in Heyuan and Xinfeng.

Xinfengjiang Reservoir was founded in July, 1958 for preventing flood, regulating the river height and the shipping, irrigating the farm etc., and completed in 1969. At the time when it was built by the order of the local government, 6 towns and many villages were flooded. Thousands of local residents had to settle in other region, such as the higher land in Heyuan (it was a county at that time), Xinfeng, Longmen, Boluo, and so on. It was estimated that about 94311 outmigrated and 15524 were forced to move to the undisturbed mountains. The wealthiest area in former Heyuan County might be covered by water forever.

In 1984, Guangdong government allowed the lake to be a tourist attraction. It became a national park in 1993, the name "Wanlü Lake" was put forward to then.

Water supply
Xinfengjiang Reservoir was used to supply clear drinkable water to Heyuan since the time it was built. However, to prevent the water from pollution, the local industry was limited. In 2006, 6 members of parliament put forward a motion that Heyuan people are below the poverty line and wish to provide the wealthier Pearl River Delta with clear water. They held the belief that through selling water, the local residents' income may be improved. Then, there is a heated discussion among public. Some specialists proof the project's possibility. In Feb 2010, Xiaohua Liu, the mayor of Heyuan revealed that the project was passed, and the agreement between Heyuan and the  seeking water cities was signed. "Through the piping system, Heyuan is able to supply 0.2 km² clear water to Shenzhen and 0.1 km² to Guangzhou every year", Liu said.

See also
 Xinfengjiang Dam
 Heyuan
 Dongyuan County
 Nongfu Spring, Chinese mineral water company based in the area.

References

Reservoirs in China
Tourist attractions in Guangdong
Bodies of water of Guangdong